Lee Eun-saem is a South Korean actress. She is known for her roles in dramas such as  The Red Sleeve, The Miracle We Met, Bad Papa, Black Dog: Being A Teacher, All of Us Are Dead. She also appeared in movies Innocent Witness, Midnight Runners, The Gangster, the Cop, the Devil, and The Fault Is Not Yours.

Filmography

Film

Television series

Web series

Awards and nominations

References

External links 
 
 

1999 births
Living people
People from Gwangju, Gyeonggi
21st-century South Korean actresses
South Korean television actresses
South Korean film actresses